The 2006 Berlin Marathon was the 33rd edition of the Berlin Marathon. The marathon took place in Berlin, Germany, on 24 September 2006.

The men's race was won by Haile Gebrselassie in 2:05:56 hours and the women's race was won by Gete Wami in a time of 2:21:34 hours.

Results

Men

Women

References

External links
33st Berlin Marathon

Berlin Marathon
Berlin Marathon
2006 in Berlin
Berlin Marathon